Tony Martino is a singer-songwriter and record producer from Chicago.  Martino is also the primary singer-songwriter and producer for his new side-project formed in 2017, The Rarest Kind, a group with a "revolving member" format in which he is the only official and permanent member.  His songs have been featured in several television shows, including the "Ghost Whisperer" on CBS, MTV's "The Real World" and "Road Rules", and many others the Discovery Channel and Sy-Fy..  He has also received critical acclaim and other mentions in major media publications and music magazines such as the Daily Herald, San Francisco Chronicle, Amplifier Magazine, and Performing Songwriter Magazine.  Martino is also known for his upfront opinions on various music-related topics.  He was quoted in The Wall Street Journal discussing the controversial use of Auto-Tune recording software. Academy Award and Emmy Award-nominated musician, Adam Schlesinger of the pop/rock band Fountains Of Wayne, also praised Martino's music in an article Schlesinger penned in The New York Times, stating, "I get handed stuff almost every day. I try to listen to all of it – 99 percent is garbage. But every so often you get something that stands out...This is a guy with incredible potential."

Biography 
Martino acts as the primary producer on all of his recordings and plays the majority of the instruments except for the drums.  Some of the notable guest drummers and musicians on his solo recordings include Doug Corella of the Verve Pipe, Steve Gillis (formerly of the rock group Filter) and Andy Kubiszewski of Stabbing Westward and Exotic Birds.  He has also co-produced some of his songs with Brit Awards-nominated record producer, Ed Buller (Suede, Pulp, etc.) As a teenager in 2004, Martino independently secured a distribution deal through Koch Records and released multiple singles on the adult album alternative radio format in the United States where he gained enough airplay to be named the  "Artist of the Month" for the entire AAA radio format, however, no tour ever commenced to support the album as Martino was still in High School at the time. In 2007, Martino was part of a very short-lived band called "The Martino Conspiracy" that briefly toured throughout mid-2007 and early 2008.  The band recorded one official album titled "Hope In Isolation" (co-produced by Martino and Ed Buller) and achieved national radio airplay on the Hot AC radio format with a released single titled "Just Don't Know".  The single charted in the top 100 national radio airplay chart for the Hot/AC format in February 2007.  Unfortunately, however, the band unexpectedly disbanded while in the middle of the tour and before the album was ever officially released. In late 2009, Martino was selected by ASCAP as only one of only fourteen up and coming songwriters out of several hundred submissions nationally to partake in their prestigious annual Lester Sill Songwriter's Workshop.

Due to injury, Martino was on hiatus from the music industry from late-2010 until re-emerging in late 2016 with news of new music. In late 2017, debuted a new music video for a song called "Just A Ride We're On" that was briefly available on Youtube under the project name "The Rarest Kind" and of which the online music blog "A&R Factory" gave a positive review.  As of March 2019, Martino is in Nashville recording the debut album for a new project called "The Rarest Kind, " with some of the early tracks having already been mixed by renowned engineer/producers Mark Needham (Imagine Dragons, The Killers, Fleetwood Mac, etc.) and Brian Malouf (Michael Jackson, Pearl Jam, Madonna, etc.), and with Brad Pemberton, formerly of Ryan Adams & The Cardinals, guesting on drums.  Martino is also writing songs for other artists.

Discography

Studio albums
'New Beginnings (2004)

Unofficial ReleasesHope in Isolation'' (2007)

References

External links 
 http://www.therarestkind.com
https://www.facebook.com/TonyMartinoMusic/
 http://www.myspace.com/rarestkind

Living people
American male singer-songwriters
American pop musicians
American rock guitarists
American male guitarists
American rock singers
American rock songwriters
Record producers from Illinois
Singers from Chicago
Year of birth missing (living people)
Guitarists from Chicago
Singer-songwriters from Illinois